Little Indian Lake is a lake in Berrien County, in the U.S. state of Michigan.

Little Indian Lake was so named on account of its diminutive size compared to nearby Indian Lake.

References

Lakes of Berrien County, Michigan